Baligansin is one of the five autonomous villages of Balikumbat Sub Division, of Ngo-Ketunjia Division of Cameroon.

See also
Communes of Cameroon

References

Populated places in Northwest Region (Cameroon)